Gaston Dumont (24 December 1932 – 21 May 1978) was a Luxembourgian cyclist. He competed in the individual road race event at the 1956 Summer Olympics.

References

External links
 

1932 births
1978 deaths
Luxembourgian male cyclists
Olympic cyclists of Luxembourg
Cyclists at the 1956 Summer Olympics
Place of birth missing